Equestrian events at the Friendship Games included show jumping, dressage and eventing in both individual and team competitions. Events were held on three venues in Poland: Jumping events were held in Sopot between 6 and 10 August, dressage – at the Książ Landscape Park near Wałbrzych between 17 and 19 August, while eventing was held at the Modern Pentathlon and Equestrian Centre of the Lubusz Sports Club "Lumel" in Drzonków on 23–26 August 1984.

Medal summary

* – Five teams competed, but only two completed the event.

Individual jumping jump-off
A jump-off was needed to determine the winner in the individual jumping event.

Medal table

See also
 Equestrian at the 1984 Summer Olympics

References

Friendship Games
Friendship Games
Friendship Games
Friendship Games